Beate Heinemann is a German particle physicist who has held positions at universities in Europe and the USA. She currently holds a joint appointment at two German institutions, Albert Ludwigs University of Freiburg and the DESY laboratory in Hamburg.

Early career 
Born in Germany, Beate Heinemann studied for her undergraduate degree (1996) and PhD (1999) in Physics at the University of Hamburg in Germany. She became an associate professor at the University of California, Berkeley in 2006.

Research 

Heinemann worked on the H1 (particle detector) experiment at DESY, Hamburg, before starting work in the international  CDF collaboration at the Tevatron (a particle accelerator at Fermilab, Batavia, USA, which was shut down in 2011).

She became a member of the ATLAS collaboration in 2007 at CERN, where she has been researching to secure a deeper understanding of the fundamental particles of the standard model. The research has progressed with confirmation of the existence of the Higgs boson at the Large Hadron Collider (LHC) in 2012. Beate Heinemann and her colleagues at CERN also strive to understand at a very fundamental level, how the universe works, what matter is made of, how matter dominated antimatter at the early hours of the universe.

Publications and media work 

She has published several hundred articles in peer reviewed scientific journals.

In 2013 she was elected as deputy spokesperson of the ATLAS Collaboration at CERN. She served until 2017 and has been quoted in the media.

Awards 
 In 2004, Heinemann was awarded a Royal Society University Research Fellowship at the University of Liverpool.
 In 2009, she was made a fellow of the American Physical Society.

References

External links
 Personal page at DESY

German women physicists
Fellows of the American Physical Society
Year of birth missing (living people)
Living people
21st-century German women scientists
21st-century German  physicists
German expatriates in the United States
University of California, Berkeley College of Letters and Science faculty
Academic staff of the University of Freiburg
People associated with CERN
University of Hamburg alumni